= Otelio Tortella d'Elea =

Italian-American Author, Poet, Screenwriter, Librettist

Otelio Tortella D'Elea
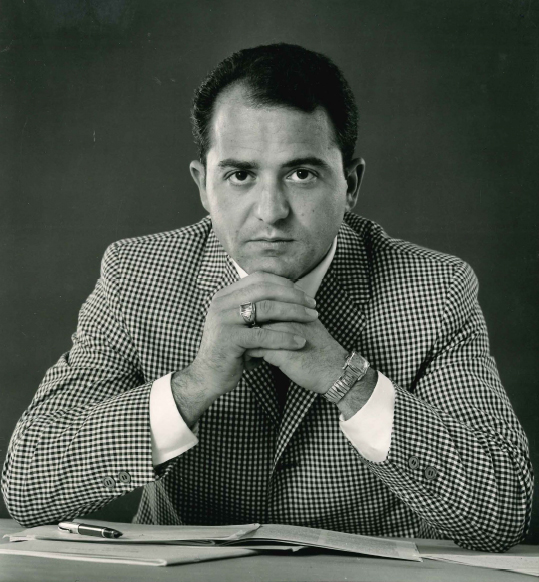
- Born: March 19, 1934; Teramo, Abruzzo, Italy
- Died: September 15, 2022 (aged 88)
- Other name: Ode Roman
- Citizenship: Italian, American
- Occupations: Journalist, poet, screenwriter, librettist
- Years active: 1958–2017
- Spouse(s): Umit Melekper Karamanle (m. 1958; div. 1967), Sofia Cristopoulos (m. 1986–2022)
- Children: 2
- Parent(s): Domenico Tortella, Maria Teresa
- Relatives: Odessa (sister); Anna Tortella (sister); Gabriel (brother)
- Awards: Silver Eiffel Tower Prize

Signature
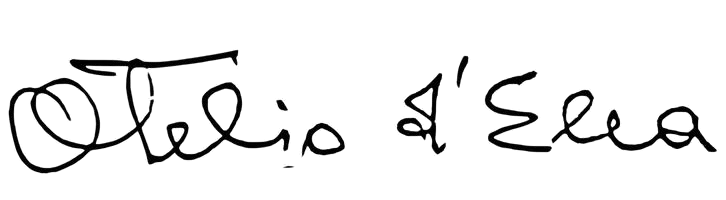

Otelio Tortella d’Elea, known as Ode Roman, (March 19, 1934 - September 15, 2022) was an Italian journalist, poet, screenwriter, and librettist. He authored 32 original screenplays and volumes of modern English and Italian rhymed poetry.

== Biography ==
Born in Teramo, Italy, in 1934, he lost his parents during World War II in 1944 and was raised in orphanages until the age of 18. He later attended university in Turin, graduating in journalism.

In 1958, he won the Silver Eiffel Tower Prize for his drama Thisbe, which was staged to commemorate the 2000th anniversary of Ovid’s birth.

He edited European Actuality, a multilingual weekly magazine, and in 1960 published the stage play Esperina, which was banned by Italian censors.

After moving to the United States in 1961, he became a naturalized U.S. citizen in 1972 and continued his literary work.

== Works ==
=== Books ===
- Jungle Chants: A Journey of Life from the Origins throughout the Ages to Eternity
- Poetica Rigeneratrice MMDCCL IV a.u.c.
- Georgiche d’ Abruzzo
- The Death of the Butterfly: A Tragic Poem

=== Films ===
- Lest We Forget (1964), a documentary about American military cemeteries in Europe.

== Awards ==
- Silver Eiffel Tower Prize (1958)
